Heartland is an American medical drama television series that aired on TNT from June 18 to August 31, 2007. It was produced by Warner Horizon Television.

On Monday, July 23, Heartland was moved to its new time beginning at 8:00pm Eastern/7:00pm Central followed by The Closer and the series premiere of Saving Grace.

On Friday, August 31, Heartland was canceled by TNT due to disappointing ratings.

Summary 
The series was based in the high-stakes world of heart-transplant surgery at "St. Jude" hospital in Pittsburgh based largely on the transplant center at the University of Pittsburgh Medical Center. It followed a recently separated couple who work both sides of the trade: She convinces the survivors and loved ones to donate the organs of the newly or about to be deceased; he races against time to implant the valuable organs into patients who are struggling against time and their failing bodies to hold on just long enough to receive the life-saving gifts.

Cast 
Treat Williams as Dr. Nathaniel "Nate" Grant
Danielle Nicolet as Mary Singletary
Morena Baccarin as Nurse Jessica Kivala
Kari Matchett as Kate Armstrong
Gage Golightly as Thea Grant
Rockmond Dunbar as Dr. Tom Jonas
Chris William Martin as Dr. Simon Griffith
Dabney Coleman as Dr. Bart Jacobs
Melinda Dillon as Janet Jacobs

Episodes 

S01, E01: "Pilot"

S01, E02: "I Make Myself Into Something New"

S01, E03: "Picking Up Little Things"

S01, E04: "Mother & Child Reunion"

S01, E05: "The Place You'll Go"

S01, E06: "Domino Effect"

S01, E07: "A Beautiful Day"

S01, E08: "As We So Wonderfully Done With Each Other"

S01, E09: "Smile"

References

External links
 

2000s American drama television series
2007 American television series debuts
2007 American television series endings
2000s American medical television series
English-language television shows
TNT (American TV network) original programming
Television shows set in Pittsburgh
Television series by Warner Horizon Television